The 2020–21 AS Trenčín season is the club's 21st season in the Slovak Super Liga and 10th consecutive. AS Trenčín participated in the Fortuna Liga and Slovak Cup. 

In pre-season club changes manager. Juraj Ančic was replaced by Stijn Vreven. In this season, after two and a half years AS Trenčín will return on a reconstructed home stadium Štadión na Sihoti. Autumn rounds of a league was played on Štadión pod Dubňom in a city Žilina. Spring matches will be played in Trenčín. On April 27 Stijn Vreven ended in AS Trenčín.

In this season AS changes club's logo. Previous logo missed historical value, reference to AS Trenčín's traditions and also right color combination. New edition contain letter "T" with dynamic design. New logo is connected with returning on the new stadium.

Players

Transfers

Transfers in

Loans in

Transfers out

Loans out

Friendlies

Pre-season

Mid-season

Competition overview

Fortuna Liga

Regular stage

League table

Results summary

Results by round

Matches

Championship group

League table

Results summary

Results by round

Matches

Europa Conference League play-offs

Semi-final

Slovak Cup

Statistics

Appearances and goals
Italics indicate a loaned player

|-
! colspan=14 style="background:#dcdcdc; text-align:center| Goalkeepers

|-
! colspan=14 style="background:#dcdcdc; text-align:center| Defenders

|-
! colspan=14 style="background:#dcdcdc; text-align:center| Midfielders 

|-
! colspan=14 style="background:#dcdcdc; text-align:center| Forwards

|-
! colspan=14 style="background:#dcdcdc; text-align:center| Players transferred out during the season

|}

Goalscorers

Notes

References

External links 
 Official website
 Futbalnet

AS Trenčín seasons
AS Trenčín season